The National Dance Awards 2009, were organised by The Critics' Circle, and presented to recognise excellence in professional dance in the United Kingdom.  The ceremony was held in the Paul Hamlyn Hall of the Royal Opera House, London, on 21 January 2010, with awards given for productions staged in the previous year.  The awards were sponsored by Yvonne Sherrington in memory of her husband Richard Sherrington, the founder sponsor of the Awards; HIT Entertainment; The Dancing Times; Dance Europe; Dance UK; Artsworld Presentations; The Council for Dance Education and Training and the website ballet.co.uk

Awards presented

De Valois Award for Outstanding Achievement
 Alexander Grant, former Principal dancer of the Royal Ballet and Artistic Director of the National Ballet of Canada

Patron's Award
 Richard Bonynge, international conductor

Dance UK Industry Award
 Marie McCluskey, Artistic Director of Swindon Dance

Dancing Times Award for Best Male Dancer
Paul Liburd, of the Scottish Ballet - WINNER
Federico Bonelli, of the Royal Ballet
Colin Dunne, freelance artist

Richard Sherrington Award for Best Female Dancer
Leanne Benjamin, of the Royal Ballet - WINNER
Elena Glurdjidze, of the English National Ballet
Daria Klimentová, of the English National Ballet

Dance Europe Award for Outstanding Company
Ballet Black - WINNER
Morphoses | The Wheeldon Company
Scottish Ballet

Best Classical Choreography
Wayne McGregor, for Infra for the Royal Ballet - WINNER
David Dawson, for Faun(e) for English National Ballet
Liam Scarlett, for Consolations and Liebestraum for the Royal Ballet

Best Modern Choreography
Christopher Bruce, for Hush for the Rambert Dance Company - WINNER
Itzik Galili, for A Linha Curva for the Rambert Dance Company
Lloyd Newson and DV8 dancers, for To Be Straight With You for DV8 Physical Theatre

PMB Presentations Award for Best Foreign Dance Company
Merce Cunningham Dance Company, United States of America - WINNER
The Forsythe Company, Germany
Royal Ballet of Flanders, Belgium

Outstanding Female Performance (Classical)
Melissa Hamilton, of the Royal Ballet - WINNER
Martina Forioso, of the Scottish Ballet
Sarah Kundi, of Ballet Black

Outstanding Male Performance (Classical)
Sergei Polunin, of the Royal Ballet  - WINNER
Tobias Batley, of Northern Ballet Theatre
Esteban Berlanga, of the English National Ballet

Outstanding Female Performance (Modern)
Amy Hollingsworth, freelance artist - WINNER
Malgorzata Dzierzon, of the Rambert Dance Company
Sally Marie, freelance artist

Outstanding Male Performance (Modern)
Thomasin Gülgeç, of the Rambert Dance Company - WINNER
Robin Dingemans, a freelance artist
Dominic North, of New Adventures

Special awards
Two new awards for young people were given: the Angelina Ballerina Children’s Award sponsored by HIT Entertainment and the Council for Dance Education and Training award for student of the year at one of the CDETs accredited professional dance schools.

Angelina Ballerina Children's Award
Lucy Wood, of the Susan Robinson School of Dance

CDET Student of the Year Award
Sam Chung, of the Tring Park School for the Performing Arts

References

National Dance Awards
Dance
Dance